Paulina Sarkanaitė (born 16 August 1998) is a Lithuanian footballer who plays as a defender for Gintra Universitetas and the Lithuania women's national team.

International goals

References

1998 births
Living people
Women's association football defenders
Lithuanian women's footballers
Lithuania women's international footballers
Gintra Universitetas players
Sportspeople from Jonava